Events from the year 1703 in Denmark.

Incumbents
 Monarch — Frederick IV
 Grand Chancellor — Conrad von Reventlow

Events
 14 April  HDMS Elephanten is launched at the Royal Danish Dockyard in Copenhagen.
 6 September Frederick VI is secretly married to Elisabeth Helene von Vieregg

Undated
 Frederick IV opens a new opera house in Copenhagen.

Births
 1 September – Just Fabritius,  businessman (died 1766)
 29 September — Baltzer Fleischer, civil servant (died 1767)
 13 October — Otto Thott, Count, minister of state and bibliophile (died 1785)
 28 October  Andreas Bjørn, businessman, shipbuilder and ship-owner (died 1750)
 12 December — Simon Carl Stanley, sculptor (died 1761)
 24 December – Christen Lindencrone, merchant and landowner (died 1772)

Deaths
 15 July — Christian Gyldenløve, Christian V's son (born 1674)
 14 October — Thomas Kingo, bishop, poet and hymn-writer (born 1634)

References

 
1700s in Denmark
Years of the 18th century in Denmark